Hearst/Carey Lake Water Aerodrome  is located  west of Hearst, Ontario, Canada.

See also
Hearst (René Fontaine) Municipal Airport

References

Registered aerodromes in Cochrane District
Seaplane bases in Ontario